George Bertram Carter (1 March 1896 – January 1986) was an English architect.

Carter attended Blackheath School of Art between 1911 and 1915 and then the Royal College of Art under William Lethaby and Arthur Beresford Pite between 1915 and 1917.  He was a pupil in the office of Edwin Lutyens between 1919 and 1922 and became Hon, Treasurer of the Modern Architectural Research Group, or MARS Group, in 1944.

Career

Carter set up in practice  in Clifford's Inn, London in 1929.

His works include:

A factory in Tottenham for B. E. White Esq.
A factory in Whitechapel for Lessor Bros.
Taymount Grange, Forest Hill, London (1935)
Lichfield Court, Sheen Road, Richmond (1935); Grade II listed
Pipenham Hall, Little Hallingbury, Essex
The Nurses' Home, St John's Hospital, Lewisham (1938; demolished after the hospital site was sold in 1986 to be developed for housing}.

Heal's (formerly Dunn's) Furniture Shop, Market Square, Bromley (1954–57)

Notes

References

1896 births
1986 deaths
20th-century English architects
Alumni of the Royal College of Art
Architects from London
People from Woolwich
Date of death missing